This list includes notable people who were born in New Rochelle, New York, or lived there for a significant period of time.

References

New Rochelle
New Rochelle